Millerton is an unincorporated community in Sumner County, Kansas, United States.  It is located about 5 miles northeast of Conway Springs at the intersection of N Maple Rd and W 123rd Ave N, next to the railroad.

History
Millerton had a post office from 1875 until 1912, but the post office there was called Rolling Green until 1884.

Education
The community is served by Clearwater USD 264 public school district.

References

Further reading

External links
 Sumner County map, KDOT

Unincorporated communities in Sumner County, Kansas
Unincorporated communities in Kansas